Milton is an unincorporated community in Randolph County, in the U.S. state of Missouri. An old variant name was "Firth".

History
Milton was laid out in 1836, and named after Milton, North Carolina, the native home of a first settler.  A post office called Milton was established in 1840, and closed temporarily in 1872. Upon reopening, the post office was renamed in order to avoid repetition with Milton, Atchison County, Missouri. A post office called Firth was established in 1883, and remained in operation until it was discontinued in 1902.

Milton once had a schoolhouse, now defunct.

References

Unincorporated communities in Randolph County, Missouri
Unincorporated communities in Missouri